Devistan I is a mountain of the Garhwal Himalaya located in the Chamoli district of Uttarakhand, India. It is 52nd highest located entirely within the Uttrakhand. Nanda Devi is the highest mountain in this category. It stands on the western rim of the Nanda Devi Sanctuary. It lies between the Devisthan II  and Devtoli . Its nearest higher neighbor Devtoli  lies 6.6 km SSW. It is located 1 km South of Devisthan II and 9.6 km NE lies Nanda Devi .

Climbing history
In 1961 A nine-member team comprising Gurdial Singh and Hari Dang of the Doon School, Major John D. Dias, Captain K. N. Thadani and Lieutenant (Dr.) N. Sharma of the Indian Army, and Suman Dubey, of Delhi and three sherpa from Darjeeling Kalden, Nima and Lhakpa.
They attempt Devistan I (21,910 feet) on the western rim of the Nanda Devi Sanctuary. They set up base camp at 15,000 feet and camp I at 17,500 and camp II at 20,000 feet. On June 16 starting at 8 a.m. they reached summit at 2 p.m. Accomplished by all the members and the Sherpas except for Captain Thadani and Lhakpa.

Glaciers and rivers
Dakshini Rishi Glacier on the eastern side and Trisul Glacier on the western side. both these glacier drains into Rish Ganga. Rishi Ganga met with Dhauli Ganga near Rini. Later Dhauli ganga met with Alaknanda at Vishnu Pryag. Alaknanda River is one of the main tributaries of river Ganga that laer joins Bhagirathi River the other main tributaries of river Ganga at Dev Pryag and became Ganga there after.

Neighboring peaks
The neighboring peaks of Maiktoli are: 
 Nanda Devi: 
 Trisul: 
 Devistan II: 
 Devtoli: 
 Tharkot:

See also
 List of Himalayan peaks of Uttarakhand

References

Mountains of Uttarakhand
Six-thousanders of the Himalayas
Geography of Chamoli district